Jacob Cox (November 9, 1810 – January 2, 1892) was an American landscape and portrait painter in Indianapolis, Indiana. Several of his paintings are in the Morris-Butler House. He is also known for his paintings of Indiana Governors James B. Ray, Noah Noble, David Wallace, Samuel Bigger, Joseph A. Wright, and Henry S. Lane.

Information
Cox was born in Philadelphia and arrived in Indianapolis in 1833 and established a stove, tinware and coppersmith business.  One of his first artistic opportunities came when he painted a banner for the presidential campaign of William Henry Harrison in 1840.  After that, he began to paint portraits and in 1842 went to Cincinnati to open a studio with John Dunn, a former treasurer of the State of Indiana.  After five months, he returned to his business in Indianapolis and continued painting as a sideline, exhibiting annually at the shows of the Cincinnati Art Union.  By 1860, he was devoted to art full-time and became well known in Indianapolis for his portraits and landscapes.

Cox was also a teacher with numerous students including William Merritt Chase.

Public collections
Paintings by Cox can be found in a number of public collections including:

 Indianapolis Museum of Art
 Morris-Butler House
 Indiana Landmarks
 Indiana State Museum
 Benjamin Harrison Home

References
 Burnet, Mary Q. Art and Artists of Indiana. New York; The Century Co., 1921.

External links
 https://web.archive.org/web/20070310230400/http://www.statelib.lib.in.us/www/ihb/govportraits/coxwallace.html
 https://web.archive.org/web/20090427183724/http://www.indianaartcollector.com/biographies.html#A10

19th-century American painters
American male painters
Artists from Indianapolis
Artists from Philadelphia
1810 births
1892 deaths
Burials at Crown Hill Cemetery
19th-century American male artists